The 2017 UEFA European Under-19 Championship qualifying competition was a men's under-19 football competition that determined the seven teams joining the automatically qualified hosts Georgia in the 2017 UEFA European Under-19 Championship final tournament.

A total of 53 UEFA member national teams entered the qualifying competition. Players born on or after 1 January 1998 are eligible to participate.

Format
The qualifying competition consists of two rounds:
Qualifying round: Apart from Spain, which receive a bye to the elite round as the team with the highest seeding coefficient, the remaining 52 teams are drawn into 13 groups of four teams. Each group is played in single round-robin format at one of the teams selected as hosts after the draw. The 13 group winners, the 13 runners-up, and the third-placed team with the best record against the first and second-placed teams in their group advance to the elite round.
Elite round: The 28 teams are drawn into seven groups of four teams. Each group is played in single round-robin format at one of the teams selected as hosts after the draw. The seven group winners qualify for the final tournament.

Tiebreakers
The teams are ranked according to points (3 points for a win, 1 point for a draw, 0 points for a loss). If two or more teams are equal on points on completion of a mini-tournament, the following tie-breaking criteria are applied, in the order given, to determine the rankings (Regulations Articles 14.01 and 14.02):
Higher number of points obtained in the mini-tournament matches played among the teams in question;
Superior goal difference resulting from the mini-tournament matches played among the teams in question;
Higher number of goals scored in the mini-tournament matches played among the teams in question;
If, after having applied criteria 1 to 3, teams still have an equal ranking, criteria 1 to 3 are reapplied exclusively to the mini-tournament matches between the teams in question to determine their final rankings. If this procedure does not lead to a decision, criteria 5 to 9 apply;
Superior goal difference in all mini-tournament matches;
Higher number of goals scored in all mini-tournament matches;
If only two teams have the same number of points, and they are tied according to criteria 1 to 6 after having met in the last round of the mini-tournament, their rankings are determined by a penalty shoot-out (not used if more than two teams have the same number of points, or if their rankings are not relevant for qualification for the next stage).
Lower disciplinary points total based only on yellow and red cards received in the mini-tournament matches (red card = 3 points, yellow card = 1 point, expulsion for two yellow cards in one match = 3 points);
Higher position in the coefficient ranking list used for the qualifying round draw;
Drawing of lots.

To determine the best third-placed team from the qualifying round, the results against the teams in fourth place are discarded. The following criteria are applied (Regulations Article 15.01):
Higher number of points;
Superior goal difference;
Higher number of goals scored;
Lower disciplinary points total based only on yellow and red cards received (red card = 3 points, yellow card = 1 point, expulsion for two yellow cards in one match = 3 points);
Higher position in the coefficient ranking list used for the qualifying round draw;
Drawing of lots.

Qualifying round

Draw
The draw for the qualifying round was held on 3 December 2015, 10:00 CET (UTC+1), at the UEFA headquarters in Nyon, Switzerland.

The teams were seeded according to their coefficient ranking, calculated based on the following:
2013 UEFA European Under-19 Championship final tournament and qualifying competition (qualifying round and elite round)
2014 UEFA European Under-19 Championship final tournament and qualifying competition (qualifying round and elite round)
2015 UEFA European Under-19 Championship final tournament and qualifying competition (qualifying round and elite round)

Each group contained two teams from Pot A and two teams from Pot B. For political reasons, Armenia and Azerbaijan (due to the disputed status of Nagorno-Karabakh), as well as Russia and Ukraine (due to the Russian military intervention in Ukraine), could not be drawn in the same group.

Notes
Teams marked in bold have qualified for the final tournament.

Groups
The qualifying round must be played on the following FIFA International Match Calendar dates unless all four teams agree to play on another date:
29 August – 6 September 2016
3–11 October 2016
7–15 November 2016

Times up to 29 October 2016 are CEST (UTC+2), thereafter times are CET (UTC+1).

Group 1

Group 2

Group 3

Group 4

Group 5

Group 6

Group 7

Group 8

Group 9

Group 10

Group 11

The Poland v Northern Ireland match was completed with a 1–0 scoreline before a default victory was awarded.

Group 12

Group 13

Ranking of third-placed teams
To determine the best third-placed team from the qualifying round which advance to the elite round, only the results of the third-placed teams against the first and second-placed teams in their group are taken into account.

Elite round

Draw
The draw for the elite round was held on 13 December 2016, 11:00 CET (UTC+1), at the UEFA headquarters in Nyon, Switzerland.

The teams were seeded according to their results in the qualifying round. Spain, which received a bye to the elite round, were automatically seeded into Pot A. Each group contained one team from Pot A, one team from Pot B, one team from Pot C, and one team from Pot D. Winners and runners-up from the same qualifying round group could not be drawn in the same group, but the best third-placed team (Belarus) could be drawn in the same group as winners or runners-up from the same qualifying round group.

Groups
The elite round must be played on the following FIFA International Match Calendar dates unless all four teams agree to play on another date:
20–28 March 2017

Times up to 25 March 2017 are CET (UTC+1), thereafter times are CEST (UTC+2).

Group 1

Group 2

Group 3

Group 4

Group 5

Group 6

Group 7

Qualified teams
The following eight teams qualify for the final tournament.

1 Bold indicates champion for that year. Italic indicates host for that year.

Top goalscorers
The following players scored four goals or more in the qualifying competition:

5 goals

 Lassi Lappalainen
 Birk Risa
 Nathan Broadhead

4 goals

 Arnel Jakupović
 Matthias Verreth
 Trent Alexander-Arnold
 Etienne Amenyido

References

External links

Qualification
2017
2016 in youth association football
2017 in youth association football